Zineb Triki (born 1980) is a French actress of Moroccan descent, known for her role as Nadia El Mansour in the French television series The Bureau.

Zineb Triki was born in 1980 in Casablanca, Morocco. She attended a French school, where she took up theatre and classical dance. She moved to Paris at the age of 15 to attend high school.

She obtained a degree in political science from McGill University in Canada. She did an internship in UN headquarters in NY in 2003. She obtained a master's degree in political science from the Sorbonne University in Paris, then obtained another master's degree in audio-visual production in Paris.

Zineb Triki began her acting career in earnest from 2009, with short roles in 14h05 and The Misadventures of Franck and Martha. Her first film roles were in Deux fenêtres in 2013 and La Marche verte (2016). It was the TV series The Bureau that brought her to prominence with her role of Nadia El Mansour.

Her performance as Nassim's mother in the 2017 film De toutes mes forces was described as "luminous, in this short and difficult role".

Filmography
Triki has performed in the following television series and films:
 2009 : 14h05
 2009 : The Misadventures of Franck and Martha
 2013 : Deux fenêtres
 2014 : Hard Copy (Theater Comedy)
 2016 : Glacé (TV series) - Charlène
 2016 : La Marche verte (Film)
 2015 – 2020 : The Bureau (TV series) - Nadia El Mansour
 2017 : De toutes mes forces (Film) - Nassim's mother
 2017 : Les grands esprits (Film) - Agathe
 2019 : Attachè (Tv Series) - raåna 
 2020 : Homeland (TV series) - Judge Haziq Qadir

References 

1980 births
Living people
French actresses
Moroccan film actresses
People from Casablanca
21st-century Moroccan actresses